The Worshipful Company of Glovers is one of the Livery Companies of the City of London. Glovers were originally classified as Cordwainers, but eventually separated to form their own organization in 1349. They received a Royal Charter of incorporation in 1639. The company is, as are most other Livery Companies, a charitable body, but it still retains close links to its original trade. Whilst traditional glove making has largely moved offshore there are still specialist UK companies engaged in the design, development, importation and distribution of technical, military, medical and industrial gloves as well as fashion companies making or distributing dress gloves in the UK and for export markets. A ceremonial link is still maintained; the Company formally presents the Sovereign with gloves upon his or her coronation.

The Company ranks 62nd in the order of precedence of Livery Companies.  The company’s motto is True Hearts and Warm Hands.

Charitable Giving

The Charity Projects Committee (CPC) administers the Glovers’ charitable donations.  Charities supported by the CPC include homeless charities who receive gloves for warmth, clinical needs and catering purposes.  We give gardening gloves to help with mental and physical therapy and clinical gloves for use in hospices.  Other commitments include cryotherapy gloves for patients undergoing cancer treatment and specialised gloves for charity led emergency services. A significant initiative is the provision of prosthetic and myoelectric hands for children and adults who would not otherwise be able to access them.  The CPC offers student bursaries to selected schools and colleges and supports community projects in areas of need.

Innovation & Design

Student glove design and safety poster design competitions are run annually to encourage practical and innovative glove design, and an awareness of hand protection in an industrial environment. The competitions are sponsored by The Glovers Company and the winners in all categories receive cash prizes, which are presented at a formal luncheon in a City of London Livery Hall.

Affiliations

The Worshipful Company of Glovers, like many other Livery Companies, has forged strong links with units of the Armed Forces as a practical demonstration of our support for the personnel upon whose protection we rely. Equally, our association with these units enables services personnel to see something of civilian life and the traditions of the City of London.
In addition to the Armed Forces, the Company has a desire to be associated with Cadet Associations and we currently have affiliations with two selected cadet units.
THE ARTISTS RIFLES  - Although this Regiment was formed many years ago, and is now part of the Reserve Forces, our first connection was in 1955 when the then Commanding Officer was a member of our Company, since then a strong reciprocal friendship has developed 
HMS ARTFUL - The Company became affiliated to HMS Cumberland in 1999 but this frigate was decommissioned in 2012. Since then, we have been honoured to become affiliated to a new nuclear powered Astute Class submarine, HMS Artful, which was fitted out at Barrow in Furness. She was officially named in September 2013 at a ceremony attended by several Glovers.
296 (STOKE NEWINGTON) SQUADRON ROYAL AIR FORCE AIR CADETS - The Glovers were affiliated to 444 (Shoreditch) Squadron Royal Air Force cadets who were disbanded in 2021.The Glovers then became affiliated to this Cadet Squadron on 2 February 2022, where at the Court of Assistants, the Master presented a certificate of affiliation to Officer Commanding 296 (Stoke Newington) Squadron Royal Air Force Cadets. The cadets of 296 had previously formed a carpet guard at our annual Banquet in 2021 and assisted us on our float at the Lord Mayors show also in 2021. It is hoped that the affiliation flourish and we look forward to developing a close relationship with the squadron in the years ahead.
ST JOHN AMBULANCE 467 BARNET CADETS - The Company became affiliated to this Cadet Association in 2014 when a signed and sealed Certificate of Adoption was presented at a ceremony at Court on 15 July, and we look forward to developing a close relationship with the Unit

The Glove Collection Trust

The Trust dates back to 1993 when it was established as a charity to advance public education in the historical social and artistic value of gloves. It took on its present form in 2003 when The Worshipful Company of Glovers of London gifted its collection then numbering about 250 items to the Trust. 
The trustees have subsequently expanded the collection to approximately 2300 items which can be viewed on the Trust’s dedicated website. 
The collection is held in the care of the Fashion Museum Bath. The trustees are asked from time to time to lend items for display at other museums, UK and overseas, and it is the trustee’s policy to agree to such requests whenever possible.

References

External links
 Official website

Gloves
Glovers
Organisations based in London with royal patronage
1349 establishments in England